The Renaissance Dallas Hotel is a 30-story,  skyscraper hotel in Dallas, Texas. The hotel, with floors, has 514 guest rooms and was completed in 1983, when it opened as a Wyndham hotel. The Renaissance Hotel currently stands as the 24th-tallest building in the city. The building was designed by architect Dahl Braden Chapman. Variously nicknamed "The Bic", "The Bic Lighter", "The Stick", "The Speedstick", "The Mennen Speedstick."

The Renaissance Dallas Hotel used to hold the world's second largest free-standing chandelier in the world. It was just replaced in 2011. The hotel is also known for its distinctive elliptical shape and diagonal roofline. The slanted roofline provides for a large curtain wall. This shelters the building's open-air rooftop swimming pool, which is one of the highest pools in Dallas. The building's unique design led to it being prominently featured in a cover image of a 1984 issue of National Geographic.

The structure initially opened in 1983 as a Wyndham hotel, but was renamed in 1987 after Stouffer parent company Nestlé approved its acquisition in 1987. Stouffer Hotels Corporation took the hotel over from real estate developer Trammel Crow via a controlling joint ownership venture and managing contract agreement. The building was acquired by Marriot International in 1997 with its Renaissance brand.

See also
 List of tallest buildings and structures in Dallas

References

External links

 

Hotel buildings completed in 1983
Buildings and structures in Dallas
Skyscraper hotels in Dallas